"Sowing the Seeds of Love" is a song by English pop rock band Tears for Fears. It was released in August 1989 as the first single from their third studio album, The Seeds of Love (1989).

The song was a worldwide hit, topping the Canadian RPM Top Singles chart and reaching the top ten in Ireland, Italy, the Netherlands, New Zealand, Spain, Sweden, United Kingdom and on the European Hot 100. In the United States, it reached  2 on the Billboard Hot 100, becoming their fourth and last top 10 hit. It also reached  1 on both the Modern Rock Tracks chart and the Cash Box Top 100.

Background
The song incorporates a number of musical styles and recording techniques, with a number of reviewers considering it a pastiche of the Beatles, produced in a tempo and style reminiscent of their late 1960s output, even for the use of a brief trumpet line very similar to the one that can be heard in "Penny Lane". It was written in June 1987, during the week of the UK General Election in which Margaret Thatcher and the Conservative Party won a third consecutive term in office. The election prompted Roland Orzabal to take an interest in politics, with a special interest in socialism. At the time of its release, he considered this to be the most overtly political song that Tears for Fears had ever recorded. The lyrics refer to Thatcher's election win with "Politician granny with your high ideals, have you no idea how the majority feels?"

Elsewhere, the song takes a dig at fellow musician Paul Weller with the line "Kick out the style, bring back The Jam" (Weller was performing with The Style Council at the time). 

The song's title was inspired by a radio programme that Orzabal had heard at the time about folk song collector Cecil Sharp. One of the songs was called "The Seeds of Love", which Sharp learned from a gardener called Mr. England (reflected in the lyric "Mr. England sowing the seeds of love"). in 1903. Sharp overheard John England singing the song, and was inspired to look more deeply into English traditional songs. The Seeds of Love was therefore the first song that Sharp collected, and the one that sparked the English folk song revival.

Critical reception
David Giles from Music Week wrote, "They've pulled out all the stops here. There seems to be three or four different songs all competing for prominence, but it's the full-blown rousing chorus that wins through, and don't be surprised to see it hurtling number one-wards."

Music video
The accompanying music video for "Sowing the Seeds of Love" was directed by Jim Blashfield, who had already made acclaimed videos for Joni Mitchell ("Good Friends"), Paul Simon ("The Boy in the Bubble") and Michael Jackson ("Leave Me Alone"). Joanna Priestley directed the "Joan Miró" section of the video for Jim Blashfield and Associates. It was animated with pencil on paper, transferred to punched acetate sheets and painted with Cel Vinyl acrylic paints. The video won two awards at the MTV Music Video Awards: Best Breakthrough Video and Best Special Effects. It was also nominated in the "Best Group Video" and "Best Postmodern Video" categories.

Release
The single was released on multiple formats, including a 7-inch single, a 12-inch single, a 12-inch picture disc, a cassette single, and a CD single.

Track listings
 7-inch and cassette single
 "Sowing the Seeds of Love" (7-inch version)
 "Tears Roll Down"

 UK 12-inch and European CD single
 "Sowing the Seeds of Love (full version)
 "Tears Roll Down"
 "Shout" (U.S. remix)

Note: The B-side track "Tears Roll Down" is an early, mostly instrumental version of "Laid So Low (Tears Roll Down)", which was released as a single in 1992 and included on the band's greatest hits album of the same name.

Charts

Weekly charts

Year-end charts

See also
List of RPM number-one singles of 1989
List of Billboard number-one alternative singles of the 1980s

References

1989 singles
1989 songs
Fontana Records singles
Music videos directed by Jim Blashfield
Cashbox number-one singles
RPM Top Singles number-one singles
Songs written by Curt Smith
Songs written by Roland Orzabal
Tears for Fears songs
Songs about Margaret Thatcher